The Ganja trolleybus system was a system of trolleybuses forming part of the public transport arrangements in Ganja, the second most populous city in Azerbaijan, for most of the second half of the 20th century.

History
The system was opened on 1 May 1955. It was closed in 2004.

Services
During the final stages of the system's operation, only route 7 was still served by trolleybuses, during the rush hour peak period.

Fleet
The Ganja trolleybus fleet in the period leading up to the system's closure was made up of 9 vehicles of types Škoda 9Tr and ZiU-682.

Previously, the system had used trolleybus vehicles of the following types:

MTB-82
Škoda 14Tr
ZiU-5
ZiU-9

See also

History of Ganja, Azerbaijan
List of trolleybus systems
Trams in Ganja, Azerbaijan
Trolleybuses in former Soviet Union countries

References

External links

 
 

Ganja, Azerbaijan
Ganja, Azerbaijan
Ganja, Azerbaijan